The Brethren is a 1904 historical novel by H. Rider Haggard set during the Third Crusade. The Brethren features Saladin and the Assassins as characters.

Modern criticism
Robert Irwin dismissed The Brethern as "Haggard's preposterous farrago". Irwin also criticized the novel's depiction of Chivalry, saying that in The Brethern "Chivalry and the public-school ethos are hardly distinguishable."

References

External links
Complete Book at Project Gutenberg
 

Novels by H. Rider Haggard
1904 British novels
Novels set during the Crusades
Cultural depictions of Saladin